Enrique Vicente Rubio Bruno (born 6 April 1943) is a Uruguayan teacher, writer and politician of the Broad Front. He served as Director of the Office of Planning and Budget between 2007 and 2009. He is currently Senator of the Republic.

Biography 
In his youth he joined the Unifying Action Groups. In 1971, he joined the leftist coalition Broad Front. After the coup d'état of 1973, he was imprisoned for being linked to the Unifying Action Groups cell that operated in the Faculty of Engineering, and for the explosion that killed student Marcos Caridad Jordan while handling material for the manufacture of explosive devices. In 1984, when several political parties were legalized, he participated in the creation of the "Independent Democratic Left" party, better known as the IDI. In 1989 he founded, together with other politicians, the Vertiente Artiguista, a group within the Broad Front. In 1994 he was elected National Representative by Florida Department. While in 1999 and 2004 he was elected Senator.

In the 2009 election, he headed the list to the Senate of the Vertiente Artiguista, being elected for the period 2010–2014.

On May 27, 2012, for the first time in its history, the Broad Front held open elections to elect its highest authorities; Rubio competed for the presidency with Mónica Xavier, Ernesto Agazzi and Juan Castillo. Finally, Monica Xavier was elected.

In the 2019 general election he was elected senator for the Vertiente Artiguista that won 2 seats in the upper house. The second is occupied by Amanda Della Ventura.  The Legislature (2020-2025) began on February 15, 2020.

References 

People from Florida Department
Broad Front (Uruguay) politicians
Vertiente Artiguista politicians
Uruguayan writers
Members of the Senate of Uruguay
1943 births
Living people